Montgomery Square is an unincorporated community in Montgomery Township in Montgomery County, Pennsylvania, United States. Montgomery Square is located at the intersection of Pennsylvania Route 309 (Bethlehem Pike) and U.S. Route 202 Business (Dekalb Pike)/Upper State Road. It is the de facto downtown of Montgomery Township.

References

Unincorporated communities in Montgomery County, Pennsylvania
Unincorporated communities in Pennsylvania